The 1970 Rothmans 12 Hour was an endurance motor race for Group E Series Production Touring Cars. The event was held at the Surfers Paradise International Raceway in Queensland, Australia on 4 January 1970 with the field divided into four classes determined by the retail price of the vehicle.

The race was won by Colin Bond and Tony Roberts driving a Class D Holden Monaro HT GTS350 for the Harry Firth run Holden Dealer Team. The pair, who four months earlier had won the 1969 Hardie-Ferodo 500 at Bathurst, covered 435 laps of the 3.219 km (2.000 mi) circuit for a distance of 1,400.265 km (870 mi).

Results

References

 A History of Australian Motor Sport, © 1980
 Modern Motor, March 1970
 Racing Car News, February 1970
 The Australian Racing History of Ford, © 1989
 The Courier Mail, Monday, 5 January 1970
 The Official Racing History of Holden, © 1988

Motorsport at Surfers Paradise International Raceway
Rothmans 12 Hour
January 1970 sports events in New Zealand